Amira Hanafi (born 1979) is an American-born poet and artist who has published several works of electronic literature. She holds both American and Egyptian citizenship. A Dictionary of the Revolution, a creative work she completed in 2017, documents the 2011 Egyptian uprising. It was the winner of the 2018 New Media Writing Prize and Denmark's 2019 Public Library Prize for Electronic Literature.

Biography
Born in Vermont in 1979, Amira Hanafi has been based in Cairo since 2010. Her involvement in poetry, culture and art is focused on her interest in working with language. Minced English (2010) is a collage based on associations with 29 terms for people of mixed race. The pages present sentences evoking the colour and violence of all the relationships which turn up, revealing how a dominant culture lay behind the language. Similarly, Forgery (2011), drawing on language linked to the keyword "Finkl", centres on Chicago's 130-year-old steel forge founded by the German immigrant Anton Finkl of A. Finkl & Sons Steel.

Published in 2020 in both English and Arabic, A Dictionary of the Revolution is designed to reveal details of the 2011 uprising based on meetings with 200 people from six Egyptian regions. Hanafi asked them to choose one of 160 words related to the revolution and express their reactions. Their responses were woven into a network of multi-voiced storytelling of the event. In 2018, the work won the New Media Writing Prize in a collaboration between Bournemouth University and if:book uk. In May 2019, it was awarded the Danish Public Library Prize for Electronic Literature.

References

External links
Amira Hanafi's website
Video of Amira Hanafi reacting to her award

1979 births
Artists from Vermont
20th-century American artists
20th-century American women artists
20th-century Egyptian artists
20th-century Egyptian women artists
20th-century American writers
20th-century American women writers
American women poets
Egyptian women poets
20th-century Egyptian writers
20th-century Egyptian women writers
Electronic literature writers
Living people